Bukonys Eldership is a Lithuanian eldership, located in a north eastern part of Jonava District Municipality. As of 2020, administrative centre and largest settlement within eldership was Bukonys.

Geography
 Rivers: Lankesa, Srautas;
 Lakes and ponds: Mimainiai lake, Biržuliai lake, Žeimelis lake;
 Forests: Siesikai forest;

Populated places 
Following settlements are located in the Bukonys Eldership (as for 2011 census):

Villages: Baravykai, Biržuliai, Bukonys, Dovydonys, Dukuvka, Gaižūnai, Garniškiai, Gečiai, Juodžiai, Kačėnai, Karaliūnai, Kaupinai, Knipai, Liepiai, Liutkūnai, Mačioniai, Madlinava, Mimainiai, Narauninkiškiai, Pasraučiai, Petrašiūnai, Ražuotinė, Rudėnai, Rukuižiai, Šapova, Šiliūnai, Širviai, Vaiškoniai, Vaivadiškiai, Žeimeliai, Žvėrynas

Demography

References

Elderships in Jonava District Municipality